Long Green Valley Historic District is a national historic district in Baltimore County, Maryland, United States. It is an approximately  rural agricultural area to the northeast of the city of Baltimore. The valley has a distinct physical unity created by gently rolling fields dotted with crossroads villages such as Glen Arm, Baldwin, and Hydes and farm complexes. Its architecture covers the 18th, 19th, and early 20th centuries and reflect major architectural styles popular in the United States from the Neoclassical of the 18th century to the Georgian Revival of the pre 1935 period.

It was added to the National Register of Historic Places in 1982.

References

External links
, including photo from 1981, at Maryland Historical Trust
Boundary Map of the Long Green Valley Historic District, Baltimore County, at Maryland Historical Trust

Historic districts in Baltimore County, Maryland
Greek Revival architecture in Maryland
Gothic Revival architecture in Maryland
Historic districts on the National Register of Historic Places in Maryland
National Register of Historic Places in Baltimore County, Maryland